{{Quote box
| width = 30em
| align =
| bgcolor = #B0C4DE
| title = Historical affiliations
| fontsize = 80%
| quote = 
 Kievan Rus' 879–1132 
 Principality of Kiev 1132–1471 
∟ part of the Kievan Rus' from 1132 to 1243 
∟ part of Vladimir-Suzdal from 1243 to 1271 
∟ part of the Kingdom of Rus' from 1271 to 1301 
∟ vassal of the Golden Horde from 1301 to 1362 
∟ part of the Grand Duchy of Lithuania from 1362 to 1471 
 Grand Duchy of Lithuania 1471–1569 
 Crown of the Kingdom of Poland 1569–1648 
∟ part of the Polish–Lithuanian Commonwealth 
 Cossack Hetmanate 1648–1737 
∟ part of the Polish–Lithuanian Commonwealth from 1648 to 1667 
∟ part of the Tsardom of Russia from 1667 to 1721 
∟ part of the Russian Empire from 1721 to 1737 
 Russian Empire 1737–1917 
 Ukrainian People's Republic 1917–1918 
 Ukrainian State 1918 
 Ukrainian People's Republic 1918–1920 
 Ukrainian SSR 1919–1941 
∟ part of the Soviet Union from 1922 to 1941 
 Reichskommissariat Ukraine 1941–1944 
∟ part of German-occupied Europe from 1941 to 1944 
 Ukrainian SSR 1944–1991 
∟ part of the Soviet Union from 1944 to 1991 
 Ukraine 1991–present
}}

 

The history of Kyiv, also spelled Kiev, officially begins with its founding year as 482, but the city may date back at least 2,000 years. Archaeology dates the site of the oldest known settlement in the area to 25,000 years BC. Kyiv was the historical capital of medieval Kievan Rus' from 879 to 1240, and is now the largest city and the capital of Ukraine.

Legend states that three brothers, Kyi, Shchek and Khoryv, and their sister Lybid, founded the city. Kyiv thus takes its name from Kyi, the eldest brother. The exact century of the city's foundation has not been determined. Legend has it that Saint Andrew (d. AD 60/70) prophesied the emergence of a great city on the future location of Kyiv. He was allegedly fascinated by the spectacular location on the hilly shores of the Dnieper River. The city is thought to have existed as early as the 6th century, initially as a Slavic settlement. Gradually acquiring eminence as the center of the East Slavic civilization, Kyiv reached its Golden Age as the center of Kievan Rus' in the 10th–12th centuries.

Its political, but not cultural, importance drastically declined when, in 1169, it was pillaged by the troops of Andrey Bogolyubsky; the old town was destroyed, and the capital moved to Vladimir. This was followed by numerous sackings of Kyiv by Rus' princes until the town was completely destroyed during the Mongol invasion in 1240.

In the following centuries, the city functioned as a provincial capital of marginal importance in the outskirts of the territories controlled by its powerful neighbors: the Grand Duchy of Lithuania, its successor the Polish–Lithuanian Commonwealth, and the Tsardom of Russia which later became the Russian Empire. Kyiv was also a major political and cultural center for Ukrainian nation, especially during the Ukrainian Cossack Hetmanate in 17–18 centuries. A Christian city since 988, it still played an important role in preserving the traditions of Orthodox Christianity, especially at times of domination by Catholic Poland, and later the atheist Soviet Union. 

Kyiv prospered again during the Russian industrial revolution in the late 19th century. In the turbulent period following the Russian Revolution of 1917, the city, caught in the middle of several conflicts, served as the capital of several short-lived Ukrainian states. From 1921 the city was part of the Soviet Union, from 1934 as the capital of Soviet Ukraine. In World War II, the city was destroyed again, almost completely, but quickly recovered in the post-war years, becoming the third most important city of the Soviet Union, the capital of the second-most populous Soviet republic. It now remains the capital of Ukraine, independent since 1991 following the dissolution of the Soviet Union.

Kievan Rus' to the Mongol invasion

According to a legend, East Slavs founded Kiev in the 5th century. The legend of Kyi, Shchek and Khoryv speaks of a founder-family consisting of a Slavic tribal leader Kyi, the eldest, his brothers Schek and Khoryv, and also their sister Lybid, who founded the city. Kyiv is translated as "belonging to Kyi" or as "Kyi's place".

The non-legendary time of the founding of the city is harder to ascertain. Slavic settlement existed in the area from the end of the 5th century, that later developed into the city. 
Archaeological excavations demonstrate the probability of commercial activity
in Kyiv's Podil district in the seventh or eighth century. However,
dendrochronological analysis of the remnants of Podil's log dwellings
provides evidence of settlement only as far back as 887, and, according
to Omeljan Pritsak, archaeologists have proven "beyond any doubt that
Kiev as a town did not exist before the last quarter of the ninth to the first
half of the tenth century."

Some western historians (e.g. Kevin Alan Brook) speculate that the city was founded by Khazars or Magyars. Brook posits that Kyiv is a Turkic place name (Küi = riverbank + ev = settlement). However, the Primary Chronicle (a main source of information about the early history of the area) mentions Slavic Kievans telling Askold and Dir that they lived without a local ruler and paid tribute to the Khazars - an event attributed to the 9th century. Brook believes that during the 8th and 9th centuries the city functioned as an outpost of the Khazar empire. A hill-fortress, called Sambat (Old Turkic for "high place") was built to defend the area.

Whatever the precise circumstances and date of its foundation, the city constituted a nodal point on important ancient trade routes, standing as it does near the confluence of the Dnipro and Desna river systems. The Dnipro came to serve as the standard route between Scandinavia and the Byzantine Empire, while the Desna gave the area water-borne access (via portages) to the Don and Oka-Volga basins.

According to the Hustyn Chronicle, Askold and Dir (Haskuldr and Dyri) ruled the Rus' Khaganate at least in 842. They were Varangian princes, probably of Swedish origin, but not Rurikids. According to the Annals of St. Bertin (Annales Bertiniani) for the year 839, Louis the Pious, the Holy Roman Emperor, came to the conclusion that the people called Rhos (qui se, id est gentem suum, Rhos vocari dicebant) belonged to the gens of the Swedes (eos gentis esse Sueonum).

According to the Primary Chronicle, Oleg of Novgorod (Helgi of Holmgard) conquered the city in 882. He was a relative of Rurik, a Varangian pagan chieftain. The date given for Oleg's conquest of the town in the Primary Chronicle is uncertain, and some historians, such as Omeljan Pritsak and Constantine Zuckerman, dispute this account and maintain that Khazar rule continued until as late as the 920s (documentary evidence exists to support this assertion — see the Kyivan Letter and the Schechter Letter).

From Oleg's seizure of the city until 1169, Kyiv functioned as the capital of Kievan Rus', which was ruled by the Varangian Rurikid dynasty which gradually became Slavicized. The Grand Princes had traditional primacy over the other rulers of the land and the Kyivan princehood was a valuable prize in an intra-dynastic system. In 968 the city withstood a siege by the nomadic Pechenegs. In 988, by order of Grand Prince Volodymyr I (St. Volodymyr), the city residents accepted baptism en-masse in the Dnipro river, an event which symbolized the Baptism of Kievan Rus to Orthodox Christianity. The city reached the height of its position – its political and cultural Golden Age – in the middle of the 11th century under Volodymyr's son Yaroslav the Wise (Grand Prince from 1019 to 1054). In 1051, prince Yaroslav assembled the bishops at St. Sophia Cathedral and appointed Hilarion as the first native-born metropolitan bishop of Rus'. In spite of the East–West Schism in Christianity, the Kievan church maintained good relations with Rome (note for example prince Iziaslav I's request to Pope Gregory VII to extend to Kievan Rus "the patronage of St. Peter", which the Pope fulfilled by sending Iziaslav a crown from Rome in 1075).

Following the fragmentation of Kievan Rus' polity, the Principality of Kiev emerged. Subsequent years saw rivalries of the competing princes of the dynasty and the weakening of Kyiv's political influence, although the city temporarily prevailed after the defeat of Polotsk at the Battle on the river Nemiga (1067) that also led to the burning of Minsk. In 1146 the next Ruthenian bishop, Kliment Smoliatich of Smolensk, was appointed to serve as the Metropolitan of Kiev and all Rus'. In 1169 Andrei of Suzdal (Bogolyubsky) sent an army against Mstislav II Izyaslavich and Kyiv. Led by one of his sons, it consisted of the forces of eleven other princes, representing three of the main branches of the Rurikid dynasty against the fourth, the Iziaslavichi of Volynia. The allies were victorious, and sacked the city for three days. They left the old town and the prince's hall in ruins, and took many pieces of religious artwork - including the Theotokos of Vladimir icon – from nearby Vyshhorod. Bogolyubsky established a new capital at Vladimir. He lost Kiev five years later.

In 1203, Prince Rurik Rostislavich captured and burned Kyiv. In the 1230s different Rus' princes besieged and ravaged the city several times. Then Mongol-Tatar forces led by Batu Khan besieged and then completely destroyed the city on 6 December 1240. The Mongols had originally planned to take the city unharmed, but upon their arrival, the garrison threw down the bodies of the Mongol diplomats sent to urge them to surrender. In revenge the Mongols broke down the gates and slaughtered much of the population, then razed the city.

Golden Horde
In the period between 1241 and 1362, the Princes of Kiev were forced to accept Mongol/Tatar overlordship. In 1245, Petro Akerovych, the Metropolitan of Kyiv, participated in the First Council of Lyon, where he informed Catholic Europe of the Mongol/Tatar threat. In 1299, Maximus (of Greek origin), the Metropolitan of Kiev, eventually moved the seat of the Metropolitanate from Kyiv to Vladimir-on-Kliazma, keeping the title. Since 1320, the city was the site of a new Catholic bishopric, when Henry, a Dominican friar, was appointed the first missionary Bishop of Kiev. In the early 1320s, a Lithuanian army led by Gediminas defeated a Slavic army led by Stanislav of Kiev at the Battle on the Irpin River, and conquered the city. The Tatars, who also claimed Kyiv, retaliated in 1324–1325, so while the city was ruled by a Lithuanian prince, it had to pay a tribute to the Golden Horde.

Grand Duchy of Lithuania

Kiev became a part of the Grand Duchy of Lithuania after the Battle at Blue Waters in 1362, when Algirdas, Grand Duke of Lithuania, beat a Golden Horde army. During the period between 1362 and 1471, the city was ruled by Lithuanian princes from different families. By order of Casimir Jagiellon, the Principality of Kiev was abolished and the Kiev Voivodeship was established in 1471. Lithuanian statesman Martynas Goštautas was appointed as the first voivode of Kiev the same year; his appointment was met by hostility from locals.

The city was frequently attacked by Crimean Tatars and in 1482 was destroyed again by Crimean Khan Meñli I Giray. Despite its diminished political significance, the city still played an important role as seat of the local Orthodox metropolitan. Starting in 1494, however, the city's local autonomy (Magdeburg rights) gradually increased in a series of acts of Lithuanian Grand Dukes and Polish Kings, finalized by a charter granted by Sigismund I the Old in 1516.

Kyiv had a Jewish community of some significance in the early sixteenth century. The tolerant Sigismund II Augustus granted equal rights to Jews in the city, on the grounds that they paid the same taxes as Podil's burghers. Polish sponsorship of Jewish settlement in the city added fuel to the conflict that already existed between the Orthodox and Catholic churches.

Kingdom of Poland

In 1569, under the Union of Lublin that formed the Polish–Lithuanian Commonwealth Kyiv with other Ukrainian territories was transferred to the Crown of the Kingdom of Poland, and it became a capital of the Kiev Voivodeship. Its role of Orthodox center strengthened due to expansion of Roman Catholicism under Polish rule. In 1632, Peter Mogila, the Orthodox Metropolitan of Kyiv and Galicia established the Kyiv-Mohyla Academy, an educational institution aimed to preserve and develop Ukrainian culture and Orthodox faith despite Polish Catholic oppression. Although ruled by the church, the academy provided students with educational standards close to universities of Western Europe (including multilingual training) and became the foremost educational center, both religious and secular.

In 1648, Bohdan Khmelnytsky's Cossacks triumphantly entered the city in the course of their uprising establishing the rule of their Cossack Hetmanate in the city. The Zaporizhian Host had a special status within the newly formed political entity. The complete sovereignty of Hetmanate did not last long as the Polish–Lithuanian Commonwealth refused to recognize it and resumed hostilities. In January 1654, Khmelnytsky decided to sign the Treaty of Pereyaslav with Tsardom of Russia to obtain a military support against the Polish Crown. However, in November 1656 the Muscovites concluded the Truce of Vilna with the Polish–Lithuanian Commonwealth, which was approved by Bohdan Khmelnytsky. After his death, in the atmosphere of sharp conflicts his successor became Ivan Vyhovsky who signed the Treaty of Hadiach. It was ratified by the Crown in a limited version. According to Vyhovsky original intention, Kyiv was to become the capital of the Grand Duchy of Ruthenia on the limited federate rights within the Polish–Lithuanian–Ruthenian Commonwealth. However, this part of the Treaty was removed during the ratification. In the meantime, Vyhovsky's opponent Yuri Khmelnytsky signed the Second Treaty of Pereyaslav in October 1659 with a representative of Russian tsar.

Russian Empire
On January 31, 1667, the Truce of Andrusovo was concluded, in which the Polish–Lithuanian Commonwealth ceded Smolensk, Severia and Chernigov, and, on paper only for a period of two years, the city of Kiev to the Tsardom of Russia. The Eternal Peace of 1686 acknowledged the status quo and put the city under the control of Russia for the centuries to come. Kiev slowly lost its autonomy, which was finally abolished in 1775 by the Empress Catherine the Great. None of the Polish-Russian treaties concerning the city have ever been ratified.

In 1834, St. Vladimir University was established in the city (now known as National Taras Shevchenko University of Kyiv). The Ukrainian poet Taras Shevchenko cooperated with its geography department as a field researcher and editor. However, the Magdeburg Law existed in Kiev till that year, when it was abolished by the Decree of Tsar Nicholas I of Russia on December 23, 1834.

Even after Kiev and the surrounding region ceased being a part of Poland, Poles continued to play an important role. In 1812 there were over 43,000 Polish noblemen in Kiev province, compared to only approximately 1,000 Russian nobles. Typically the nobles spent their winters in the city, where they held Polish balls and fairs. Until the mid-18th century Kiev was Polish in culture. although Poles made up no more than ten percent of the city's population and 25% of its voters. During the 1830s Polish was the language of Kiev's educational system, and until Polish enrollment in the university of St. Vladimir was restricted in the 1860s they made up the majority of that school's student body. The Russian government's cancellation of the city's autonomy and its placement under the rule of bureaucrats appointed from St. Petersburg was largely motivated by fear of Polish insurrection in the city. Warsaw factories and fine Warsaw shops had branches in Kiev. Józef Zawadzki, founder of Kiev's stock exchange, served as the city's mayor in the 1890s. Poles living in the city tended to be friendly towards the Ukrainian national movement in the city, and some took part in Ukrainian organizations. Indeed, many of the poorer Polish nobles became Ukrainianized in language and culture and these Ukrainians of Polish descent constituted an important element of the growing Ukrainian national movement. Kiev served as a meeting point where such activists came together with the pro-Ukrainian descendants of Cossack officers from the left bank. Many of them would leave the city for the surrounding countryside in order to try to spread Ukrainian ideas among the peasants.

According to the Russian census of 1874, of 127,251 people living in Kiev, 38,553 (39%) spoke "Little Russian" (the Ukrainian language), 12,917 (11%) spoke Yiddish, 9,736 (10 percent) spoke Great Russian, 7,863 (6 percent) spoke Polish, and 2,583 (2 percent) spoke German. 48,437 (or 49%) of the city's residents were listed as speaking "generally Russian speech (obshcherusskoe narechie)." Such people were typically Ukrainians and Poles who could speak enough Russian to be counted as Russian-speaking.

From the late 18th century until the late 19th century, city life was increasingly dominated by Russian military and ecclesiastical concerns. Russian Orthodox Church institutions formed a significant part of the city's infrastructure and business activity at that time. In the winter 1845–1846, the historian Mykola Kostomarov (Nikolai Kostomarov in Russian) founded a secret political society, the Brotherhood of Saints Cyril and Methodius, whose members put forward the idea of a federation of free Slavic people with Ukrainians as a distinct group among them rather than a part of the Russian nation. The Brotherhood's ideology was a synthesis of programmes of three movements: Ukrainian autonomists, Polish democrats, and Russian Decembrists in Ukraine. The society was quickly suppressed by the Tsarist authorities in March–April 1847.

Following the gradual loss of Ukraine's autonomy and suppression of the local Ukrainian and Polish cultures, Kiev experienced growing Russification in the 19th century by means of Russian migration, administrative actions (such as the Valuev Circular of 1863), and social modernization. At the beginning of the 20th century, the city was dominated by Russian-speaking population, while the lower classes retained Ukrainian folk culture to a significant extent. According to the census of 1897, of the city's approximately 240,000 people approximately 56% of the population spoke the Russian language, 23% spoke the Ukrainian language, 12.5% spoke Yiddish, 7% spoke Polish and 1% spoke the Belarusian language. Despite the Russian cultural dominance in the city, enthusiasts among ethnic Ukrainian nobles, military and merchants made recurrent attempts to preserve native culture in the city (by clandestine book-printing, amateur theater, folk studies etc.).

During the Russian industrial revolution in the late 19th century, Kiev became an important trade and transportation center of the Russian Empire, specializing in sugar and grain export by railroad and on the Dnieper river. By 1900, the city had also become a significant industrial center, having a population of 250,000. Landmarks of that period include the railway infrastructure, the foundation of numerous educational and cultural facilities as well as notable architectural monuments (mostly merchant-oriented, i.e. Brodsky Choral Synagogue).

At that time, a large Jewish community emerged in the city, developing its own ethnic culture and business interests. This was stimulated by the prohibition of Jewish settlement in Russia proper (Moscow and Saint Petersburg) — as well as further eastwards. Expelled from Kiev in 1654, Jews probably were not able to settle in the city again until the early 1790s. On December 2, 1827, Nicholas I of Russia expelled seven hundred Jews from the city. In 1836, the Pale of Settlement banned Jews from Kiev as well, fencing off the city's districts from the Jewish population. Thus, at mid-century Jewish merchants who came to fairs in the city could stay for up to six months. In 1881 and 1905, notorious pogroms in the city resulted in the death of about 100 Jews.

The development of aviation (both military and amateur) became another notable mark of distinction of Kyiv in the early 20th century. Prominent aviation figures of that period include Pyotr Nesterov (aerobatics pioneer) and Igor Sikorsky, both of whom hailed from the city. The world's first helicopter was built and tested in Kiev by Sikorsky, and in 1892 the first electric tram line of the Russian Empire was established in the Principality of Kiev.

Independence and Civil War

In 1917, the Central Rada (Tsentralnaya Rada), a Ukrainian self-governing body headed by the historian Mykhailo Hrushevsky, was established in the city. Later that year, Ukrainian autonomy was declared. During the period of dual power this body competed for authority with the Russian Army loyal to the Russian Provisional Government and later with the Bolsheviks.

On 7 November 1917, it was transformed into an independent Ukrainian People's Republic with the capital in Kiev. During this short period of independence, the city experienced rapid growth of its cultural and political status. An Academy of Sciences and professional Ukrainian-language theaters and libraries were established by the new government.

Later the city became a war zone in the lasting and bloody struggle between Ukrainian, Polish and Russian Bolshevik governments in the time of the Russian Revolution, the Ukrainian-Soviet War, the Polish-Ukrainian War and the Polish-Soviet War.

Ukrainian Soviet Socialist Republic
After the "January Uprising" on January 29, 1918 was extinguished, Bolshevik Red Guards took the city in the Battle of Kiev, forcing the Central Rada to flee to Zhytomyr. The Bolsheviks established Kharkov as the capital of the Ukrainian Soviet Republic. By March, the city had been occupied by the Imperial German Army under the terms of the Treaty of Brest-Litovsk.

With the withdrawal of German troops after the end of World War I, an independent Ukraine was declared in the capital city under Symon Petliura. Red Army forces once again recaptured the city in the January 1919 battle of Kiev, taking the time to conduct a city-census of Kyiv. In August 1919, the White armies recaptured the city, before losing it to the bolsheviks again in the Battle of Kiev of December 1919.

It was then briefly occupied by the White armies before the Soviets once more took control in 1920. In May 1920, during the Russo-Polish War it was briefly captured by the Polish Army but they were driven out by the Red Army.

After the Ukrainian SSR was formed in 1922, Kharkov was declared its capital. Kiev, being an important industrial center, continued to grow. In 1925, the first public buses ran on city streets, and ten years later the first trolleybuses were introduced. In 1927 the suburban areas of Darnytsia, Lanky, Chokolivka, and Nikolska slobidka were included into the city. In 1932, the city became the administrative center of newly created Kyiv Oblast.

1930s
In the 1930s, the city suffered terribly from famine and from Stalinization. In 1932–33, the city population, like most of the other Ukrainian territories, suffered from the Holodomor. In Kiev, bread and other food products were distributed to workers by food cards according to daily norm, but even with cards, bread was in limited supply, and citizens were standing overnight in lines to obtain it.

In 1934 the capital of Ukrainian SSR was moved from Kharkov to Kiev. The goal was to fashion a new proletariat utopia based on Stalin's blueprints. The city's architecture was made over, but a much greater impact on the population was Soviet social policy, which involved large-scale purges, coercion, and rapid movement toward totalitarianism in which dissent and non-communist organizations were not tolerated.

In the 1930s the process of destruction of churches and monuments, which started in the 1920s, reached the most dramatic turn. Churches and structures that were hundreds of years old, such as St. Michael's Golden-Domed Cathedral and the Fountain of Samson, were demolished. Others, such as Saint Sophia Cathedral, were confiscated. The city's population continued to increase mostly by migrants. The migration changed the ethnic demographics of the city from the previous Russian-Ukrainian parity to predominantly Ukrainian, although Russian remained the dominant language.

In the 1930s, the city inhabitants also suffered from the controversial Soviet political policy of that time. While encouraging lower-class Ukrainians to pursue careers and develop their culture (see Ukrainization), the Communist regime soon began harsh oppression of Ukraine's political freedom, autonomy and religion. Recurring political trials were organized in the city to purge "Ukrainian nationalists", "Western spies" and opponents of Joseph Stalin inside the Bolshevik party. During this time, numerous historic churches were destroyed or vandalized and the clergy repressed.

In the late 1930s, clandestine mass executions began in Kiev. Thousands of city residents (mostly intellectuals and party activists) were arrested in the night, hurriedly court-martialed, shot and buried in mass graves. The main execution sites were Babi Yar and the Bykivnia forest. Tens of thousands were sentenced to GULAG camps. In the same time, the city's economy continued to grow, following Stalin's industrialization policy.

World War II
During the Second World War, Nazi Germany occupied the city on 19 September 1941 (see the Battle of Kiev). Overall, the battle proved disastrous for the Soviet side but it significantly delayed the German advances. The delay also allowed the evacuation of all significant industrial enterprises from Kiev to the central and eastern parts of the Soviet Union, away from the hostilities, where they played a major role in arming the Red Army fighting the Nazis (see, for example, the Arsenal Factory).

Before the evacuation, the Red Army planted more than ten thousand mines throughout the city, controlled by wireless detonators. On 24 September, when the German invaders had settled into the city, the mines were detonated, causing many of the major buildings to collapse, and setting the city ablaze for five days. More than a thousand Germans were killed.

Babi Yar, a location in Kiev, became a site of one of the most infamous Nazi WWII war crimes. During two days in September 1941, at least 33,771 Jews from Kiev and its suburbs were massacred at Babi Yar by the SS Einsatzgruppen, according to their own reports. Babi Yar was a site of additional mass murders of captured Soviet citizens over the following years, including Ukrainians, Romani, POWs and anyone suspected in aiding the resistance movement, perhaps as many as 60,000 additional people.

In the "Hunger Plan" prepared ahead of the Nazi invasion of the Soviet Union, with the aim of ensuring that Germans were given priority over food supplies at the expense of everyone else, the inhabitants of the city were defined as "superfluous eaters" who were to be "gotten rid of" by the cutting off of all food supplies to the city – the food to be diverted to feeding the Wehrmacht troops and Germany's own population. Luckily for city inhabitants, this part of the "Hunger Plan" was never fully implemented.

An underground resistance quickly established by local patriots was active until the liberation from Nazi occupation. During the war, the city was heavily bombarded, especially in the beginning of the war and the city was largely destroyed including many of its architectural landmarks (only one building remained standing on the Khreschatyk, a main street).

While the whole of Ukraine was a '[Third] Reich commissariat', under the Nazi Reichskommissar Erich Koch, the region surrounding Kiew (as it is spelled in German) was one of the six subordinate 'general districts', February 1942 – 1943 Generalbezirk Kiew, under Generalkommissar Waldemar Magunia (b. 1902 – d. 1974, also NSDAP)

The city was liberated by the Red Army on 6 November 1943. For its role during the War the city was later awarded the title Hero City.

Postwar Ukrainian SSR
Despite the end of the war, on September 4–7, 1945, an antisemitic pogrom occurred around one hundred Jews were beaten, of whom thirty-six were hospitalized and five died of wounds.

1950s–1990s
The postwar period in Kiev was one of rapid socio-economic growth and political pacification. The arms race of the Cold War caused the establishment of a powerful technological complex in the city (both research and development and production), specializing in aerospace, microelectronics and precision optics. Dozens of industrial companies were created employing highly skilled personnel. Sciences and technology became the main issues of the city's intellectual life. Dozens of research institutes in various fields formed the Academy of Sciences of the Ukrainian SSR.

The city also became an important military center of the Soviet Union. More than a dozen military schools and academies were established here, also specializing in high-tech warfare (see also Soviet education). This created a labor force demand which caused migration from rural areas of both Ukraine and Russia. Large suburbs and an extensive transportation infrastructure were built to accommodate the growing population. However, many rural-type buildings and groves have survived on the city's hills, creating Kiev's image as one of the world's greenest cities.

The city grew tremendously in the 1950s through 1980s. Some significant urban achievements of this period include establishment of the Metro, building new river bridges (connecting the old city with Left Bank suburbs), and Boryspil Airport (the city's second, and later international airport).

Systematic oppression of pro-Ukrainian intellectuals, dubbed as "nationalists", was carried under the propaganda campaign against Ukrainian nationalism threatening the Soviet way of life. In cultural sense it marked a new wave of Russification in the 1970s, when universities and research facilities were gradually and secretly discouraged from using Ukrainian. Switching to Russian, as well as choosing to send children to Russian schools was expedient for educational and career advancement.

Thus the city underwent another cycle of gradual Russification.

Every attempt to dispute Soviet rule was harshly oppressed, especially concerning democracy, Ukrainian SSR's self-government, and ethnic-religious problems. Campaigns against "Ukrainian bourgeois nationalism" and "Western influence" in Kiev's educational and scientific institutions were mounted repeatedly. Due to limited career prospects in Kyiv, Moscow became a preferable life destination for many Kievans (and Ukrainians as a whole), especially for artists and other creative intellectuals. Dozens of show-business celebrities in modern Russia were born in Kiev.

In the 1970s and later 1980s–1990s, given special permission from the Soviet government, a significant part of the city's Jews migrated to Israel and the West.

The Chernobyl accident of 1986 affected city life tremendously, both environmentally and socio-politically. Some areas of the city have been polluted by radioactive dust. However, inhabitants of Kiev were neither informed about the actual threat of the accident, nor recognized as its victims. Moreover, on May 1, 1986 (a few days after the accident), local CPSU leaders ordered Kievans (including hundreds of children) to take part in a mass civil parade in the city's center—"to prevent panic". Later, thousands of refugees from accident zone were resettled in Kiev.

Independent Ukraine

Capital of an independent nation

After 57 years as the capital of the Ukrainian Soviet Socialist Republic of the Soviet Union, the city became the capital of independent Ukraine in 1991.

The city was the site of mass protests over the 2004 Ukrainian presidential election by supporters of opposition candidate Viktor Yushchenko beginning on 22 November 2004 at Independence Square. Much smaller counter-protests in favor of Viktor Yanukovych also took place.

The city hosted the Eurovision Song Contest 2005 on 19 and 21 May in the Palace of Sports.

Until 2012, the city's mayor was Leonid Chernovetsky.

In February of 2014, the city was the site of the Revolution of Dignity, also known as the Maidan Revolution.

In 2014, Vitali Klitschko, former professional boxer, became the city's mayor.

2022 Russian invasion

In 2022, during the Russian invasion of Ukraine, a Russian offensive attempted to surround and besiege the city, and multiple teams of Russian soldiers and mercenaries entered the city to assassinate president Volodymyr Zelenskyy in what was widely reported to be an attempt at regime change.

Kyiv city suffered missile strikes, with the city's inner metro stations being used as air raid shelters. One of the air strikes partly damaged Kyiv TV Tower and Babi Yar memorial.

The Russian assault in Kyiv Oblast was defeated. After Russian forces' withdrawal, evidence was discovered of systematic war crimes, especially in the satellite city of Bucha.

On 10 October, a mass missile strike hit the city, killing 8.

See also
 Timeline of Kyiv

References

Further reading

 Cybriwsky, Roman Adrian. Kyiv, Ukraine: the city of domes and demons from the collapse of socialism to the mass uprising of 2013–2014 (Amsterdam UP, 2016) online.
 Cybriwsky, Roman Adrian. "Whose city? Kyiv and its river after socialism." Geografiska Annaler: Series B, Human Geography 98.4 (2016): 367–379.
 Estraikh, Gennady. "From Yehupets Jargonists to Kyiv modernists: The rise of a Yiddish literary Centre, 1880s‐1914." East European Jewish Affairs 30.1 (2000): 17–38.
 online review
Luckyj, George Stephen Nestor. Young Ukraine: The Brotherhood of Saints Cyril and Methodius in Kiev, 1845–1847 (University of Ottawa Press, 1991). 
 Meir, Natan M. Kiev: Jewish Metropolis, a History, 1859–1914 (Indiana UP, 2010) 403pp Examines political, religious, demographic, cultural, and other aspects of Kyiv's Jews, from the official readmission of Jews to the city to the beginning of World War I.
 Meir, Natan M. "Jews, Ukrainians, and Russians in Kiev: Intergroup relations in late imperial associational life." Slavic Review (2006): 475–501. online
 Pavlychko, Solomea. Letters from Kiev (1992). 
 Surh, Gerald. "The Role of Civil and Military Commanders During the 1905 Pogroms in Odessa and Kiev." Jewish Social Studies: History, Culture, and Society 15.3 (2009): 39–55 online.

Other languages
 History of Kyiv (История Киева), three volumes. Kyiv: Naukova dumka, 1982–1986.
 F.Berlynskyi. History of Kyiv (Історія міста Києва). Kyiv: Naukova dumka, 1991.
 History of Kyiv (Історія міста Києва). Kyiv: Institute of History, Academy of Sciences of Ukrainian SSR, 1960.

External links
 Ancient Kyiv: rapid development and dramatic decay - BEST KYIV GUIDE
 Gorod Kiev – Kiev historical website
 Kiev History Site – All Kiev history
 History of Kyiv – KievGid.Net portal

 
Kyiv